MKb-42 is an abbreviation for Maschinenkarabiner 42, one of two German assault rifles:

the Haenel Maschinenkarabiner 42(H)
the Walther Maschinenkarabiner 42(W)